A prison furlough is an authorized temporary release granted to a prison inmate. Prisoners on furlough may be allowed to leave unescorted, but, if accompanied by guards, often they must pay for the expense. Furloughs are sometimes granted for medical reasons or to allow inmates to attend funerals or make contact for employment upon release. There is some evidence that furloughs reduce violent outbursts, although there have also been high-profile cases in which furloughed prisoners committed crimes while on furlough, returned late, or remained at large. In the Federal Bureau of Prisons, furloughs are considered neither a reward for good behavior nor a means to shorten a criminal sentence, but are intended strictly to further correctional goals.

References

Sentencing (law)
Penology